Jules Burnotte (born December 29, 1996) is a Canadian biathlete from Sherbrooke, Quebec.

Career

Junior
Burnotte made his Canadian debut at the Biathlon Junior World Championships 2014 and won silver in the men's youth 3 × 7.5 km relay.

Senior
In 2020, at the IBU World Championships, Burnotte had his career best performance, a 28th-place finish in the individual event. Burnotte was part of the Canadian team during the 2021–22 Biathlon IBU Cup season.

In January 2022, Burnotte was named to Canada's 2022 Olympic team. At the games, Burnotte was part of the relay team that finished in 6th, Canada's highest ever placement in the event.

World Championships results

References

1996 births
Living people
Canadian male biathletes
Sportspeople from Sherbrooke
Biathletes at the 2022 Winter Olympics
Olympic biathletes of Canada